Coral Gables Senior High School is a secondary school located at 450 Bird Road in Coral Gables, Florida.

Coral Gables SHS opened its doors in 1950; its architectural design reflects a Spanish influence, with open courtyards adorned with water fountains. New buildings have been added to its  campus, most recently a three-story building.

Coral Gables SHS is accredited by the Southern Association of Colleges and Schools (SACS). The last review took place in the spring of 2006. The instructional faculty consists of 183 teachers. Eighty-two members of the faculty have a master's degree and six faculty members have earned a doctorate degree. Coral Gables High School was one of only twelve high schools in the nation to win the Siemens Foundation's Award for Advanced Placement. It ranks 221st in Newsweeks Top 1,000 U.S. Schools.

Coral Gables SHS is served by the Miami Metroail at the Douglas Road Station.

History
The school opened in 1950 for the education of white students only. High school students had been moved from the previous campus, Ponce de Leon High School. The new Coral Gables High retained the school yearbook name, Caveleon, and the school mascot, "Cavaliers". Ponce de Leon High School became Ponce de Leon Junior High School. The building had a cost of $1,500,000. It had 63 classrooms, a bright color scheme, a mixed cafeteria and auditorium or cafetorium, a laundry room, and a then-modern type of public address system.

In 1965, when integration of public schools was mandated by the federal courts, the nearby black school, Carver was closed, and many black students transferred to Coral Gables. Initially, black students were not allowed to attend school social events, but sports became a great unifier. Football coach Nick Kotys and others manned the doors to allow entrance to black students. One of the new students, Craig Curry, became known as "the Negro quarterback" and led the team to an undefeated season in which they dominated the mostly all-white competition, ultimately being named "The Team of The Century" by the FHSAA

In September 2009 a 17-year-old student stabbed another 17-year-old student to death at the school. The perpetrator received a 40-year prison sentence. Francisco Alvarado of the Miami New Times said that the incident "spawned a lot of reactionary comments from Coral Gables High parents and former students, expressing shock that such a violent episode could take place at an otherwise well-behaved school in an affluent neighborhood".

Demographics
Coral Gables SHS is 82% Hispanic (of any ethnicity), 6% Black, 10% White non-Hispanic and 2% Asian/other.

During the 1950s some Jewish students were in the attendance zone for Coral Gables High but were instead sent to Miami High School; this was especially the case with girls, as many high-status girls' clubs at Coral Gables High did not admit Jews.

News magazine

highlights is the Coral Gables SHS news magazine. It has been in circulation since 1948. The 2015-2016 school year was the first that highlights was published as a news magazine with six yearly issues instead of a newspaper format with seven to eight yearly issues. The change was made due to perceived shifts in the taste of the student body. Each issue of highlights has 32 pages and includes 6 sections: Features, News, Opinion, Sports, The Scene, and Insight sections.

highlights participates in the Florida Scholastic Press Association's (FSPA) district and statewide conventions, and has received the top 'All-Florida' award for several years. It received the highest rating in the state, the Sunshine Standout award twice from FSPA at the 2019 and 2021 state conventions. The staff's work has been nationally recognized by the Columbia Scholastic Press Association (CSPA) and the National Scholastic Press Association (NSPA).  It has received Pacemaker status from NSPA recognizing over a decade of excellent scholastic achievement.

Literary magazine
Catharsis is the literary magazine of Coral Gables SHS. It was previously called Encore. The 30-member staff produced its first magazine under the new name in 2010. It has been accepted to membership in the Florida Scholastic Press Association (FSPA) and the National Scholastic Press Association (NSPA).

Model United Nations
Model United Nations is a club in which students participate in various competitions around the state of Florida and The United States as a whole. MUN is an educational simulation and/or academic activity in which students can learn about and practice their skills in diplomacy, international policy, policymaking, international relations, and the United Nations. Currently, there are four competitions in which the team attends, including; Miami-Dade College MUN, Florida International University MUN (FIUMUN), Gator Mun hosted by the University of Florida, and MICSUN hosted by the University of Miami. The club hosts a yearly Model United Nations competition for middle schoolers called Cav MUN, in which middle schoolers may practice their skills in Model United Nations within a High School environment.

Gablettes
The Gablettes are the Coral Gables Senior High School Dance Team, originally founded in 1975.

Band of Distinction and Color Guard

The Coral Gables Band of Distinction is a student group dedicated to music. The group contributes to the community by entertaining at pep-rallies, football games, and competitions. Band members participate in competitions such as the Florida Bandmasters Association's solo and ensemble competitions.

The Gables Guard is the color guard of Coral Gables SHS. During the fall, the band and color guard perform together at school football games and marching competitions. In winter, the color guard performs and competes in indoor competitions, such as SFWGA. The Coral Gables Guard is well known for their intricate, innovative routines. Each member competes in the Florida Bandmasters Association's solo and ensemble competitions.

Notable alumni
Zach Banks, professional race car driver
Maxine Clark, founder of Build-A-Bear Workshop
Steve Cohen, U.S. Congressman 
Keith Davids, United States Navy Rear Admiral and White House Military Office director
Gail Edwards, actress, It's a Living, Blossom, and Full House
Robert H. Frank, professor of economics at Cornell University and business columnist for The New York Times
Lillian Glass, author and media personality
Lynda Goodfriend, American actress, Happy Days 
Gil Green, music video and film director
Paul Jennings Hill, first person to be executed for killing an abortion provider
Silvio Horta, television producer, Ugly Betty and Jake 2.0
Katherine Kurtz, fantasy writer
William B. Lenoir, astronaut on Space Shuttle Columbia
Donna Jo Napoli, children's author
David Norona, television actor
Paul Steinhardt, co-discover of icosahedrite, a naturally-occurring icosahedral quasicrystal
Janet Reno, former U.S. Attorney General
Karen Russell, author
Winston Scott, former NASA astronaut and retired U.S. Navy Captain
Roy Sekoff, founding editor of Huffington Post
Hugh Wilson, movie director and writer, creator of WKRP in Cincinnati, and Emmy Award winner
George Winston, jazz and new-age pianist
Frank Zagarino, film actor

Athletics

Football
Tom Bailey, professional football player, Philadelphia Eagles
Glenn Cameron, professional football player, Cincinnati Bengals
Neal Colzie, professional football player, Miami Dolphins, Oakland Raiders, and Tampa Bay Buccaneers
Craig Curry - "Negro Quarterback" of Gables first integrated team, which was named Team of the Century by the FHSAA
Al Del Greco (Class of 1980) - placekicker, Green Bay Packers, Phoenix Cardinals, Houston Oilers

Gary Dunn - Pittsburgh Steelers
Frank Gore, former professional football player
Buddy Howell, professional football player, Los Angeles Rams
Patrick McCain, National Arena League professional football player, Jacksonville Sharks 
Ralph Ortega, professional football player, Atlanta Falcons
Denzel Perryman, professional football player, Las Vegas Raiders
Larry Rentz, former professional football player, San Diego Chargers
Pat Ruel, offensive line coach, Seattle Seahawks
Darryl Sharpton, professional football player, Houston Texans and Washington Redskins
Gerald Tinker, Olympic athlete and professional football player, Atlanta Falcons
Jonathan Vilma, professional football player, New York Jets and New Orleans Saints
Van Waiters, professional football player, Cleveland Browns and Minnesota Vikings
Cary Williams, professional football player, Baltimore Ravens, Philadelphia Eagles, Seattle Seahawks, and Tennessee Titans

Other sports
Yonder Alonso, professional baseball player, Cincinnati Reds, San Diego Padres
Juan Alvarez, former professional baseball player, Anaheim Angels, Texas Rangers, Florida Marlins
Randy Clark, former professional boxer
Al Cueto, ABA basketball
Jonathan Diaz, professional baseball player, New York Yankees
Mike Fuentes, former professional baseball player, Montreal Expos
Rick Greene, former professional baseball player, Cincinnati Reds
Glen Johnson, boxer
Mike Lowell, professional baseball player, Boston Red Sox, Florida Marlins, and New York Yankees
Jim Maler, former professional baseball player, Seattle Mariners
Eli Marrero, professional baseball player, St. Louis Cardinals
John Pennel, pole vaulter and airst person to clear ; 11 world records; two-time Olympian
Eddy Rodríguez, professional baseball player, San Diego Padres
Woody Woodward, former professional baseball player, Atlanta Braves and Cincinnati Reds and manager of the Seattle Mariners

See also

Miami-Dade County Public Schools
Education in the United States

External links
Official website

References

Educational institutions established in 1950
Miami-Dade County Public Schools high schools
Buildings and structures in Coral Gables, Florida
1950 establishments in Florida